|}

The Prix de l'Abbaye de Longchamp is a Group 1 flat horse race in France open to thoroughbreds aged two years or older. It is run at Longchamp over a distance of 1,000 metres (about 5 furlongs), and it is scheduled to take place each year in early October.

History
The event is named after the Abbaye de Longchamp, an abbey founded in the 13th century by Isabelle, the sister of Saint Louis. The abbey was located on what became the northern edge of the racecourse. It was destroyed during the French Revolution, and its site is now partly occupied by the Château de Longchamp.

The Prix de l'Abbaye was one of two major races introduced to celebrate Longchamp's centenary in 1957. Both were added to the Prix de l'Arc de Triomphe fixture, which is usually on the first Sunday in October. The other event, the Prix du Moulin, was subsequently moved to September.

The present system of race grading was introduced in 1971, and the Prix de l'Abbaye was initially given Group 2 status. It was promoted to Group 1 level in 1976. It originally excluded geldings, but the restriction was lifted in 2001.

The Prix de l'Abbaye became part of the Breeders' Cup Challenge series in 2009. From this point the winner earned an automatic invitation to compete in the Breeders' Cup Turf Sprint. It was removed from the series in 2011.

Records
Most successful horse (2 wins):
 Texanita – 1963, 1964
 Gentilhombre – 1976 (dead-heat), 1977
 Committed – 1984, 1985
 Lochsong – 1993, 1994

Leading jockey (5 wins):
 Yves Saint-Martin – Fortino (1962), Texanita (1963), Silver Shark (1965), Farhana (1966), Lianga (1975)

Leading trainer (8 wins):
 François Mathet – Texana (1957), Edellic (1958), Fortino (1962), Texanita (1963, 1964), Silver Shark (1965), Farhana (1966), Moubariz (1974)

Leading owner (4 wins):
 François Dupré – Texana (1957), Fortino (1962), Texanita (1963, 1964)
 Robert Sangster – Committed (1984), Double Schwartz (1986), Handsome Sailor (1988), Carmine Lake (1997)

Winners since 1972

Earlier winners

 1957: Texana
 1958: Edellic
 1959: Sly Pola
 1960: High Bulk
 1961: L'Epinay
 1962: Fortino
 1963: Texanita
 1964: Texanita
 1965: Silver Shark
 1966: Farhana
 1967: Pentathlon
 1968: Be Friendly
 1969: Tower Walk
 1970: Balidar
 1971: Sweet Revenge

See also
 List of French flat horse races

References
 France Galop / Racing Post:

 galop.courses-france.com:
 1957–1979, 1980–present

 france-galop.com – A Brief History: Prix de l'Abbaye de Longchamp.
 galopp-sieger.de – Prix de l'Abbaye de Longchamp.
 horseracingintfed.com – International Federation of Horseracing Authorities – Prix de l'Abbaye de Longchamp (2018).
 pedigreequery.com – Prix de l'Abbaye de Longchamp – Longchamp.

Specific

Open sprint category horse races
Longchamp Racecourse
Horse races in France
Recurring sporting events established in 1957
1957 establishments in France